The Jammu–Baramulla line is a railway track being laid to connect the Kashmir Valley in the Indian union territory of Jammu and Kashmir with Jammu railway station and thence to the rest of the country. The 356 km railway track will start from Jammu and end at Baramulla. It comes under the jurisdiction of the Firozpur railway division of Indian Railways' Northern zone. The total project cost in 2022 was INR28,000 crore (~US$3.5 billion).

Construction of the route faced natural challenges including major earthquake zones, extreme temperatures and inhospitable terrain. The project has had a long and chequered history, and serious progress was made only after it was declared a National Project of India in 2002. Although scheduled completion date for the project was 15 August 2007, the revised timeline for the completion of remaining Katra–Banihal section of the project is November-December 2023.

The extension of railway line from Baramulla to Kupwara has also been approved, and revised Detailed Project Report (DPR) for it was submitted in July 2020 by the Railway Board.

Timeline

1897: The Jammu–Sialkot railway line is built from Sialkot in British India to Jammu in the princely state of Jammu and Kashmir. Around 40-45 km in length, the line traversed a flat plain and did not face any particular engineering challenges. It provided the only connection of the princely state to India's rail network.

1902: The British Raj proposes a rail link along a route following the Jhelum River, connecting Srinagar to Rawalpindi. This would connect the Kashmir region of the princely state to the Indian rail network separately from the Jammu region, which was already connected to Sialkot. The proposal does not find favour in the Maharaja's court, firstly because it leaves out most of the state's population centers, which are strung along the more-southerly Moghul road connecting Jammu and Srinagar, and secondly, because it could accentuate the disconnect between the two regions of the state (Jammu and Kashmir). Also, the proposed railway line seems to serve the military interests of the British more than the interests of the state and its people, whereas the state would have to bear most of the expense.

1905: Britain again proposes a link between Rawalpindi and Srinagar. Instead, Maharaja Pratap Singh approves a rail line between Jammu and Srinagar via Reasi and the Moghul road. This route would certainly connect the major population centers of the state, but the terrain is difficult to an extreme degree. The electric line would have used mountain streams as a source of hydro-electric power. The narrow gauge and high-altitude pass would have made the line weather-dependent and restricted its speed and capacity, similar to the Darjeeling Himalayan Railway. However, this line was never built.

1947: With the partition of India, the Jammu–Sialkot line is closed since Sialkot is now in Pakistan. Jammu (and thereby the entire state of Jammu and Kashmir) is disconnected from the Indian rail network, and Pathankot (100 km south-east of Jammu) is the nearest railhead. A new line from Pathankot to Jammu is obviously needed, and there are no particular engineering hurdles either, but no work on such a line is initiated for the next twenty-four years by the Congress governments which held power continuously in India during this period.

1971: The foundation stone is laid and construction commences for a railway line linking Jammu to Pathankot, and thereby to the Indian rail network. The imminent Indo-Pakistani War of 1971 may have given an impetus to this long-neglected project, which would enable the movement of men and supplies to Jammu, much closer to the disputed border.

1975: For the first time since 1947, the state of Jammu and Kashmir is connected to the Indian railway network. The railway line between Jammu and Pathankot is inaugurated and the renovated Jammu Tawi railway station is opened. It will remain the northern end of the line (and the Indian Rail Network) for the next thirty years. Notably, this is the same situation which had existed between 1897 and 1947, when Jammu was connected to Sialkot. It is now connected to Pathankot, and the rest of the state, northward, remains unconnected.

In fact, it will take 21 years (until 2004) and cost  to build the 53 km line through mountainous terrain. A proposed extension to Srinagar is dismissed as economically unfeasible after a cursory, preliminary survey of the Pir Panjal Range.

1994: While the Jammu-Udhampur line remains unfinished after many extensions of time and money, the railway minister announces a rail line to Baramulla, well beyond even Srinagar. It is learned that the proposed line will begin from Qazigund and run to Srinagar and then onwards to Baramulla. This means that there will be two disconnected stretches of track within the state, and that the proposed new line, which will service only the Kashmir valley, will not connect to the national network. The reason for this is that laying a railway line from Udhampur to Qazigund (a distance of around 120 km) through the mountains seems unattainable, in view of the non-progress of the Jammu-Udhampur stretch.

2002: Eight years after the announcement, little progress has been achieved since 1994 on the proposed "Valley" line (later known as "Leg 3"), mainly due to militancy and Pakistan-sponsored terrorism. The Vajpayee government declares the railway line a national project, to be funded entirely by the central government. It also states that an unbroken rail link is imperative, and that they will spend whatever money is required and provide all required environmental or other clearances to establish a rail link from Udhampur through Katra to Qazigund, and then onwards through Srinagar to Baramulla. The estimated cost is now .

2004: The 53 km long Jammu–Udhampur section finally opens, 21 years and  after its beginning, the line's Leg 0. The line, which cuts through the Shivalik Hills, has 20 major tunnels and 158 bridges.

2008 (Sept): The Ministry of Railways cancels the project on the existing alignment between Katra and Qazigund due to suspected geological instability, ordering Konkan Railway (which had been tasked with the project) to stop all work on the section (including the Chenab Bridge) and terminate all contracts issued for work on the section before major route changes. The Railway Board appoints a committee to examine the feasibility of the project's Leg 2 and rework the Pir Panjal Range route, proposing a fresh survey for a shorter line.

2008 (Oct): The 66 km section between Anantnag and Manzhama (Mazhom near Pattan, outside Srinagar) opens on 11 October 2008, with twice-daily service in both directions. Complications continue to affect the project for connection with the plain.

2009 (Feb): On 14 February 2009, Leg 3 service is extended beyond Mazhom/Pattan to Baramulla. An extension of the track from Baramulla northward to Kupwara had been proposed, and its survey was completed in 2009, but the proposal is kept in abeyance for the time being.

2009 (June): In June 2009, work on the section between Katra and Qazigund is resumed after the committee approves the existing alignment with only minor changes. Additional geotechnical tests of rock strata and changes to other portions of the alignment would be reviewed.

2009 (Oct): On 29 October the same year (2009), the 18 km-long section from Anantnag to Qazigund is inaugurated by the prime minister, marking the completion of Leg 3. This means that the entire "Valley" portion of the line, from Qazigund to Baramulla, as proposed in 1994, is now operational, but it remains disconnected from the national railway network. 

2010: In December, Indian Railways completes a crucial tunnel in Sangaldam on the route between Katra and Banihal (on the Katra-Banihal-Qazigund section).

2011–12: Boring of the 11.215 km (7-mile) long Pir Panjal Railway Tunnel, known informally as the Banihal–Qazigund tunnel, is completed in October 2011. This was a crucial and extremely challenging project and its completion is hailed as an achievement. Tracks are laid during the following year, and a trial run begins on 28 December 2012. This means the line northward from Banihal (to Qazigund and on to Baramulla) is ready, but not the southward stretch towards the rest of India. Eight years after the contract to design and build the world's tallest rail bridge was awarded to Afcons Infrastructure Limited, excavation of the foundations of the  bridge across the Chenab River begins. The construction of all tunnels between Udhampur and Katra, including the T1 Tunnel which had seepage problem, was completed.

2013: The Pir Panjal Railway Tunnel and Banihal station are opened. Trains can now run northward from Banihal on Jammu side through the tunnel to Qazigund on the Kashmir side and there onwards up to Baramulla. However, the southward connection to the rest of India is still incomplete. On 9 December 2013, a trial train reaches Katra from the Udhampur side, marking an engineering achievement on the southern side.

2014: On 11 June, a (second?) trial train from Delhi arrives in anticipation of the opening of the Udhampur–Katra line, which will connect Katra to the rest of the country. On 4 July, the Udhampur-Katra line is opened and the Katra railway station is inaugurated. Commercial railway services now exist from the rest of India up to Katra, and also from Banihal all the way north to Baramulla, but the stretch from Katra to Banihal, an extremely challenging stretch, as described below, remains unfinished.

2018: On 8 November 2018, the Central Government approves extension of railway line northward from Baramulla to Kupwara. It may be recollected that the project had been proposed in the mid-2000s and a survey had been carried out in 2009.

2019: Status as of July 2019 is as follows: All portions of the track are ready except for the link between Katra and Banihal. This stretch of track is only 111 km long, but as much as 97.34 km of this is made up of tunnels. There will also be 27 major bridges (mostly connecting one tunnel to another tunnel) and 10 minor bridges along this length. Among these bridges will be one built across the deep gorge of the Chenab river near the Salal hydro-electric dam. This bridge of steel arches will be 1315 metres long and will stand at a height of 359 metres from the ground, which is 35 metres more than the height of the Eiffel tower. The project, which also encompasses 203 km of access roads, is expected to be ready by 2021.

April 2021: The main Arch of the Chenab Bridge (near Salal dam) is completed and closed on 5 April 2021. Now construction of structures like tracks, side railings, girders and access amenities on top of the arch bridge will begin.

Mar 2022: The piers on the top of the main Arch are ready. Launching the girders has started.

Progress

The railway line is divided into four sections:

 Leg 0, running 53 km from Jammu to Udhampur and completed in April 2005.

 Leg 1, running 25 km from Udhampur to Katra. The section was completed on 4 July 2014.

 Leg 2, running 111 km from Katra to Banihal section has total tunnels 35 ie 27 main and 8 escape. This under construction section is expected to be completed by nov-dec 2023.

 Leg 3 running 135 km from Banihal to Baramulla. The section was completed on 26 June 2013.

Leg 0

Leg 0 has been operational since 2005. It was built over 21 years, between 1983 and 2004-05.

Leg 1
Leg 1 has been operational since July 2014. The leg had missed opening dates in the past, including December 2005, December 2006 and May 2009. Work on the section, suspended for two years due to a partial tunnel collapse, resumed in September 2009. Although the section was planned to open by 2 February 2014, passenger service was delayed due to Commission of Railway Safety concerns about one bridge and tunnel. The route includes seven tunnels and 30 bridges. The section was opened on 4 July 2014.

Leg 2
Leg 2, running 111 km from Katra to Banihal is under construction, may be completed in 2022. Construction on the leg has been beset by technical difficulties with alignment and disputes with contractors, and was originally expected to be finished in 2017–18. This is the line's most difficult section of the rail line, with 62 bridges and a number of tunnels totalling 10 km out of total 129 km. It requires 262 km of access roads connecting 147,000 people in 73 villages; 160 km, connecting 29 villages, is completed. In July 2008, work on part of the Katra-Banihal section was suspended for a possible realignment. The alternative alignment, proposed by the railway, reduced the track length from 126 km to 67 km. A committee appointed by the Railway Board recommended abandoning 93 km of the previously-approved alignment. On 12 November 2014, the Delhi High Court directed the central government to appoint a committee to review the 126 km-long section.

An 18 km stretch of Leg 2, between Quazigund and Banihal, was authorised on 26 June 2013. The stretch includes the 11.215-km (7-mile) Pir Panjal Railway Tunnel, also known as the Banihal railway tunnel. India's longest rail tunnel, it is 8.4 m wide and 7.39 m high. The tunnel includes a 3 m-wide service road for maintenance and emergency use. Its average elevation, 1760 m, is 440 m below the existing road tunnel.

The tunnel facilitates transportation during winter (when inclement weather closes the Srinagar-Jammu highway), and halves the distance between Quazigund and Banihal (35 km by road and 17.5 km by train). The Banihal railway station is 1,702 m (5,584 ft) above mean sea level, and trains run from Banihal to Qazigund through the tunnel. The 5 km Banganga section was expected to be operational before the completion date of 2017–18 for the entire project.

This leg contains the construction of two extremely challenging bridges, an arch bridge on the Chenab river and cable-stayed Anji Khad Bridge.

Status updates
Status update of under construction 148 km route from Katra to Banihal.

 Oct 2018: work on Chenab Bridge have stopped due to difference of opinion between contractor and railway staff.

 Dec 2018: Rail line likely to miss 2020 deadline due to COVID-19.

 Aug 2019: New target period for completion is 2021–22.

 July 2020: The Railways have completed the construction of over 20 out of 37 small and large bridges. The Union Railway Minister Piyush Goyal announced that the construction of this leg will be completed by August 2022.

Aug 2022: 75% (28) of total 37 bridges and 97.6% of 35 tunnels (160.52 km out of total 164 km tunnel length completed, including 95.47 km of 27 main tunnels and 65.05 km of 8 escape tunnels) of tul completed. Cumulative spend on Katra-Banihal rail link up to June is INR23071 crore (~US$3 billion). Chenab Railway Bridge - world's highest railway bridge also completed after its 'Golden joint' was launched on Chenab river and minor works on 1.3 km long bridge is expected to be completed by November 2022.

Leg 3

Leg 3 has been operational since October 2009. The line from Baramulla to Banihal, across the Pir Panjal Range, is 130 km long. Since the 25 km-long Udhampur-Katra section was commissioned in October 2013, only the 148 km Katra-Banihal section of Leg 2 remains to be constructed. Until the Katra-Laole section of railway is finished by 2020, travel from Jammu Tawi (or Udhampur) to Banihal by road and from Banihal to Srinagar by rail is possible.

The Banihal–Baramulla section is also being electrified, and track-electrification work has been in full swing since July 2020.

In June 2017 Ministry of Railways also laid the foundation stone of five new halt railway stations on the Banihal–Baramulla section i. e. Sangdan, Ratnipora, Razwan, Monghall and Nadigam but civil works of these stations has yet to start.

Extension
 Nov 2018: Central Government approved extension of the railway line from Baramulla to Kupwara. On 22 August 2020, Railway officials told in meeting with Lt. Governor that 39-km-long Baramulla-Kupwara rail link with an estimated cost of Rs 3843 crore, the survey was completed and submitted to the Railway Board in July 2020.

Infrastructure and construction

The line may be the most difficult rail project undertaken on the Indian subcontinent. The young Himalayas are geologically surprising and problematic. Although the Indian temperatures are less severe, the region experiences harsh winters with heavy snowfall. In the Pir Panjal Range, most peaks exceed  in height.

The route includes many bridges, viaducts and tunnels. The Chenab Bridge will be the highest railway structure of its kind in the world,  higher than the top of the Eiffel Tower. Both bridges will be simple. Weathering steel is planned for an environmentally-friendly appearance and to eliminate the need for painting. The design and structure is similar to West Virginia's New River Gorge Bridge. The project is managed by the Konkan Railway Corporation. Completion was scheduled for 2012 (four years after the first isolated section of the route was opened for local passenger service), and it requires 26,000 tonnes of steel.

All tunnels are built with the New Austrian tunnelling method, and a number of challenges have been encountered while tunnelling through the geologically-young, unstable Sivalik Hills. In particular, water entered the Udhampur-to-Katra section; this required drastic solutions with steel arches and several feet of shotcrete. Along with shotcrete, lattice girder support were provided according to different class of rocks found along the entire terrain of mountains in the proposed project.
Although the rail line is being built through a mountainous region, a one-percent ruling gradient has been set to provide a safe, smooth, reliable journey. Bank engines will not be required, making the journey quicker and smoother. It will use  broad gauge continuous welded rail laid on concrete sleepers, with a minimum curve radius of 676 m. The maximum speed will be . Provision for future doubling will be made on major bridges. Provisions for future electrification will also be made, although the rail line will use diesel locomotives initially; the region is presently electricity-scarce. There will be 30 stations on the route, initially served by 10–12 trains per day.

Closed-circuit television cameras at major bridges, tunnels and stations are planned, and all major bridges and tunnels are illuminated.

Rolling stock

Passenger service will be provided by high-power diesel multiple units and heated, air-conditioned coaches have wide windows, sliding doors and reclining seats. The driver's cabin has a heating and defogging unit, and is fitted with a one-piece glass window for a wider view. A snow-cutting cattle guard is attached to the front of the train to clear snow from the tracks during winter. Due to the valley's cold climate, the 1,400-horsepower diesel engine has a heating system for quick, trouble-free starts. Coaches have a public-information system (display and announcements) and a pneumatic suspension for riding comfort. There is a compartment for the physically disabled, with wider doors.

Freight rolling stock for the route will come from the existing national fleet. Freight service (grain and petroleum products) will run between the 10–12 daily passenger trains. Maintenance will be done at the Badgam workshop, north of Srinagar. Three-aspect colour-light signalling is being installed on the route for safety, and GSM-R equipment may be installed in the future to improve its quality.

Project agencies
Indian Railways is in charge of the  Udhampur-Katra section. The subsidiary Konkan Railway Corporation is in charge of the  Katra-Laole section. Ircon International, a public-sector company, is in charge of the  Dharam-Qazigund-Baramulla section. One hundred thirty-eight kilometres of the line, including the valley and the Pir Panjal Railway Tunnel, is operational. Hindustan Construction Company built the  Pir Panjal tunnel through the range for about ₹900 crore. Afcons Infrastructure Limited and South Korea's Ultra Engineering will design and build the Chenab Bridge for around ₹974 crore. Gammon India and South Africa's Archirodon Construction will build the Anji Khad Bridge for ₹745 crore.

Construction-related casualties
June 2005 – Altaf Hussain, a Hindustan Construction Company (HCC) labour, was killed by a tunnel collapse in Tathyar; two others were injured.
16 May 2007 – Two girls, ages nine and seven, drowned in an excavated ditch.
14 Feb 2008 – A Nepali labour named Tika Ram Balwari was killed after being struck by a boulder in the Uri Varmul.
18 Apr 2008 – Late at night while working on the Katra-Qazigund project, a dump truck rolled into a deep gorge in Lower Juda More (near Kouri in Reasi district). Tara Chand Singh, driver of the tipper including five other labours namely Resham Singh and Shambhu Ram, residents of Pattian in Reasi, Dhani Ram, Sandeep Lal and Vishno, residents of Nepal were killed and two others were injured.
27 Mar 2011 – Two workers, Abdul Rahman (age 34) and Jumma Baksh (24) were killed at a railway bridge under construction over the Chenab River in the Reasi district when the basket in which they were riding (attached to a crane) unhooked and fell over 100 metres.

See also
 Baramulla
 Jammu
 Anji Khad Bridge
 Chenab Bridge
 Pahalgam
 Aharbal
 Gulmarg
 Verinag
 Qazigund
 Dal lake
Kupwara
Lolab Valley
Mughal Road

References

External links
Design features of Jammu Baramulla line
Railway Map on Openstreetmap
Pir Panjal Railway Tunnel T80 By N.A.T.M

Rail transport in Jammu and Kashmir
Proposed railway lines in India
5 ft 6 in gauge railways in India
Transport in Baramulla
Transport in Jammu
Transport in Katra, Jammu and Kashmir
Transport in Srinagar
Transport in Udhampur